Arroba de los Montes is a municipality in the Province of Ciudad Real, Castile-La Mancha, Spain. It has a population of 611.

Municipalities in the Province of Ciudad Real